Sudan requires its residents to register their motor vehicles and display vehicle registration plates.

References

Sudan
Transport in Sudan
Sudan transport-related lists